Operation Tvigi '94 (Croatian:operacija tvigi 94) was a military operation during the Croat-Bosniak War which was conducted by the Croatian Defence Council (HVO) on the 24th of January 1994 and was a tactical victory for the HVO.
 
HVO forces claimed the village of Here from the Army of the Republic of Bosnia and Herzegovina. The Rama brigade with this successful operation achieved a great strategic and moral goal: aside from the tactical victory, the HVO captured an important strategic position and halted the offensive of the Bosniak forces. The battle changed the balance of power on the Rama-Uskoplje front, marking a turning point in the war between the HVO and the Republic of Bosnia and Herzegovina.

The victory by the HVO set the stage for the prelude of the Washington Agreement, which ended the Croat-Bosniak War.

References

Military operations of the Bosnian War
1994 in Bosnia and Herzegovina
Conflicts in 1994
January 1994 events in Europe